Vania Koleva Jordanova is a physicist known for her work on space weather and geomagnetic storms. She was elected a fellow of the American Geophysical Union in 2021.

Education and career 
Jordanova has a Ph.D. from the University of Michigan (1995) and started at Los Alamos National Laboratory in 2006 as a technical staff member. Jordanova was the director for the Space Hazards Induced near Earth by Large Dynamic Storms (SHIELDS) project which examines hazards from space weather that can cause deleterious impacts on technology on Earth such as radio, television, and cellphones.

Selected publications

Awards and honors 
Jordanova was on the Van Allen Probes project team that was awarded a National Aeronautic and Space Administration (NASA) Group Achievement Award in 2013 In 2020, she was named a Laboratory Fellow of the Los Alamos National Laboratory. In 2021 she was elected a fellow of the American Geophysical Union.

References

External links 

 

Fellows of the American Geophysical Union
Living people
Women space scientists
Women physicists
University of Michigan alumni
Los Alamos National Laboratory personnel
Year of birth missing (living people)